In Scotland, Marine Protected Areas (MPAs) are areas of sea defined so as to protect to habitats, wildlife, geology, undersea landforms, historic shipwrecks, and to demonstrate sustainable management of the sea. As of December 2020, approximately 37% of Scotland's seas are covered by the Scottish MPA network, which comprises 244 sites in total.

Designation

As of December 2020 Scotland's MPA network comprises 244 sites protected by a variety of different conservation designations, many of which are the same as those used on land, such as Special Protection Areas (SPA) and Sites of Special Scientific Interest (SSSI). This figure includes four sites designated in December 2020: North-east Lewis; Shiant East Bank; Sea of the Hebrides; and the Southern Trench.

The legal framework for designating MPAs depends on the designation: for example SSSIs are designated under the Nature Conservation (Scotland) Act 2004. Where not designated under other conservation legislation MPAs are designated under one of two acts of parliament, depending on their location:

The Marine (Scotland) Act 2010 is an act of the Scottish Parliament which gives the Scottish Government the power to designate MPAs in Scottish Territorial Waters (waters up to 12 nautical miles off the coastline).
The Marine and Coastal Access Act 2009 is an act of the UK Parliament which gives the Scottish Government the power to designate MPAs in Scottish Offshore Waters (waters lying further from the coast than 12 nautical miles, and defined as Scottish by the Scottish Adjacent Waters Boundaries Order 1999).

Sites are designated as MPAs under these acts for one of three purposes:

Nature Conservation MPAs are defined to protect biodiversity
Historical MPAs are used to protect sites such as marine wrecks and artefacts
One Demonstration and Research MPA has been defined to test novel approaches to marine management

In addition to the statutory MPAs, five sites are recognised as forming part of the Scottish MPA network, being categorised as "other area based measures": such areas, although not specifically created for nature conservation purposes, are considered to contribute to the protection of marine biodiversity. The makeup of the network as of December 2020 is detailed in the table below:

Management
The lead body for management of the MPAs is Marine Scotland. For nature conservation sites within territorial waters NatureScot is responsible for developing the network and providing scientific advice to Scottish Government on the selection of sites, and providing advice to Marine Scotland on management once sites are designated. The Joint Nature Conservation Committee fulfils this role for sites in offshore waters, and also has a coordinating role for nature conservation in all the UK's offshore waters. Historic Environment Scotland is responsible for historic MPAs.

Activities undertaken in an MPA can be managed through voluntary measures, or by implementation of Marine Conservation Orders or Inshore Fishing Orders. Management measures (such as restrictions on the type of fishing gear that can be used) may be in place for all or part of an MPA, and may only apply at certain times of year. Environmental groups have criticised the government for failing to enforce fishing rules around MPAs.

List of MPAs
These tables list those MPAs not covered by other designations (i.e. excluding SACs, SPAs, and SSSIs etc.) as of December 2020.

Historic MPAs

Nature Conservation MPAs

Demonstration and Research MPA
There is one Demonstration and Research MPA, in the waters surrounding Fair Isle. The MPA was designated on 9 November 2016. The aims of this MPA designation are defined as being:

Other area based measures

Proposed NCMPAs
Two further Historic MPAs are also proposed as of 2020, with an Historic Environment Scotland consultation exercise having closed on 27 November. The two proposed sites are:

The wreck of the Swedish East India Company ship Queen of Sweden in Bressay Sound, Shetland
10.7 km2 of Scapa Flow, Orkney, including the site of the scuttled German High Seas Fleet.

References

Bibliography

Citations

External links
Scotland's Marine Protected Area network - NatureScot
Marine Heritage - Historic Environment Scotland

Lists of protected areas of Scotland
Marine Protected Areas of Scotland